Dymock railway station was a stop on the former Ledbury and Gloucester Railway. It opened in 1885 and served the Gloucestershire village of Dymock. It was closed for passengers in 1959 but remained open for freight traffic until 1964 when the line was closed.

References

Further reading

Disused railway stations in Gloucestershire
Former Great Western Railway stations
Railway stations in Great Britain opened in 1885
Railway stations in Great Britain closed in 1959
Dymock